The following list comprises the characters that form the three ranks of the army of the Greek goddess Athena, in the Japanese manga Saint Seiya and the canonical sequel and prequel Saint Seiya Next Dimension, written and illustrated by Masami Kurumada.

The  are the warriors that form Athena's army, clad in special battle armors known as Cloths, who during millennia have battled to protect Athena, love and justice. It is the main warring faction presented by Kurumada in his work. Although the three ranks swore allegiance to Athena, Kurumada presented some of the characters at first in an antagonic role, later revealing their true nature.

Bronze Saints

The  are the lowest-ranking Saints in Athena's army. As their mastery over the Cosmo essence is at the basic level, the Bronze Saints wield superhuman strength, among other abilities, and a maximum speed of mach 1. Aside from the five protagonist Bronze Saints, Kurumada presents six more in his work, described as follows.

Voice Actor: Kōsuke Meguro, Hideo Ishikawa (OVA), Akie Yasuda (child), Vic Mignogna (English), Sasha Paysinger (child, english)
The second Bronze Saint to appear in the story was Jabu the Unicorn Saint. As a fellow orphan he had been sent out with 99 more of his brothers by their father Mitsumasa Kido. He achieved the Cloth of Monoceros the Unicorn in Algeria and returned to Japan to participate in the Galaxian Wars tournament to receive the Gold Cloth of Sagittarius. He easily defeated Lionet Ban in his first match but was outmatched against Andromeda Shun whose chains proved impenetrable. He returned to his master in Algeria to further his training, and during this time his Cloth came to upgrade itself as well. When Saori Kido had been shot by a golden arrow, he came to her rescue and protected her from the then antagonistic forces of the Sanctuary. After that he came to reside in the Sanctuary and protected it against the Saints Hades had revived, and protected Pegasus Seiya's sister Seika from the attacks of the god of death.

Voice actor: Masato Hirano, Masaya Onosaka OVA, John Swasey (English)
Hydra Ichi was like the other Bronze Saints that participated in the Galaxian Wars a fellow orphan. His and the other Bronze Saint's father Mitsumasa Kido was the founder of the Graud foundation. After being taken from the orphanage by Mitsumasa he was sent out to train in Finland to become a Saint of Athena. He came back years later to participate in the Galaxian Wars that were now held by Mitsumasa's adopted granddaughter Saori Kido. In his first match Ichi had to battle Cygnus Hyōga. The Hydra Saint underestimated his opponent who froze him to near death. Ashamed by his defeat, he asked Saori for permission to undergo further training in Finland with his master. She agreed and thus Ichi didn't reappear until Saori was put in danger in Sanctuary after being struck by a golden arrow. From then on, he served her as Athena and came to reside in Sanctuary. Later he protected Sanctuary from the revived Saints, and protected Pegasus Seiya's sister from the death god Thanatos.

Voice actor: Hideyuki Tanaka (Japanese, Episodes 1-60), Takeshi Kusao, (Japanese, Episodes 61-114) Kazunari Kojima (Japanese, OVA); Nathan Parmer (English), Jessica Boone (English, as a child)
Nachi is one of the 100 orphans that were brought into the Graud Foundation to fulfill a project: to be trained to become future Saints for the goddess Athena. Only 10 of the children survived the entire process, and they grew up to become Bronze Saints. In the Galaxy Wars arc, Nachi loses the tournament and decides to return to Liberia to continue his training, later returning with the other four Bronze Saints to rescue Tatsumi and the comatose Athena. They stay with them until Gold Saint Gemini Saga, the false Pope of Sanctuary, is defeated. In the Hades arc, Nachi and Ichi are appointed commanders over the Sanctuary guards. As the dead Silver Saints start appearing and they realize their attacks are useless, they are saved by the timely appearance of Jabu. Later Nachi risks his life to protect Seika from Thanatos.

Voice Actor: Hirohiko Kakegawa (1986), Naoki Imamura(2008), Rick Burford(english)
The Saint bearing the Leo Minor constellation in 1990 was Ban. He was sent along with 99 other orphans to different parts of the world to train to become a Saint. He earned his Cloth on Mount Kilimanjaro in Tanzania, and was thus one of the only ten that had succeeded in their training. When he returned to Japan to the Galaxian Wars fighting tournament, however, he met an early defeat at the hands of Unicorn Jabu. Feeling ashamed by his defeat, he returned to Tanzania to undergo further training, and returned when Athena had been incapacitated by the golden arrow. There, he protected the goddess from the soldiers of Sanctuary. He came to stay in Sanctuary and protected Seiya's sister Seika from the assault of the god Thanatos.

Voice Actor: Yūji Mikimoto (1986), Kouhei Fukuhara (2008), Rob Mungle (English)
Geki was one of Mitsumasa Kido's one hundred children who were placed in various orphanages. He was sent to  Canada where he trained and managed to become the Bronze Saint of Ursa Major the Great Bear amongst Athena's 88 Saints. He returned to Japan and participated in the Galaxian Wars Tournament held by the Graude foundation. Unfortunately, he met with defeat at the hands of the Pegasus Saint, Seiya, and had to recover. With permission from Athena, Geki returned to his master in Canada for further training. When Athena was hit by the fatal golden arrow, the Bear Saint reappeared to protect her. After the events that followed, he came to stay in the Sanctuary due to the impending war against Hades, and stood his ground against the god of death Thanatos when he tried to take the life of Seiya's sister.

Voice actor: Hiromi Tsuru (Japanese), Shelley Calene-Black (English)
June was trained alongside Andromeda Shun on Andromeda Island under the tutelage of Cepheus Daidalos. She was very protective of the Andromeda Saint, and tried to make him quit to avoid him getting hurt. Despite her wishes, Shun attained Sainthood and left for Japan, leaving June behind. She completed her training successfully and earned the Bronze Chameleon Cloth. Soon after, her master was assassinated by Pisces Aphrodite. When she heard about the Bronze Saints' plans to defy Sanctuary, she immediately set out to stop Shun. Shun respected her feelings but intended to join his brothers nevertheless, and knocked her unconscious in a small fight. The Andromeda Saint carried her to the Kido mansion to rest until his return. After a brief appearance during the Twelve Temples arc in a flashback, to date, June has never reappeared in Kurumada's manga.

Silver Saints
They possess advanced mastery of Cosmo, which enables them to attain speeds ranging from mach 2 to 5, and also grants them tremendous physical strength. When they receive an assignment from the Sanctuary, they go to any part of the world to fulfill it, whatever the cost, using all their power. They represent the true concept of a Saint of Athena.

Another of their responsibilities is to take care of the Cloths that do not have owners. It is common to find Silver Saints training potential candidates to gain one of these Cloths. As many Saints and Cloths were lost in the last Holy War, training new Saints and increasing the ranks are important tasks to be fulfilled before the next Holy War.

The Silver Cloths are more beautiful and stronger than Bronze Cloths. They freeze at a temperature of -200 °C. Currently there have only been eighteen Silver Cloths confirmed, however, the Silver Cloths of Orion, Shield and Southern Cross, created by Masami Kurumada for the first Saint Seiya theatrical release, as well as their bearers, are considered canonical.

The seventeenth and eighteenth Silver Cloths were revealed in the Saint Seiya Encyclopedia; they represent the constellations of Crateris and Ara, although the latter has never been featured in any arcs of the manga to date. In total there are twenty-four Silver Saints, but only sixteen were revealed by Kurumada in the story arcs of his manga Saint Seiya. Recently, since the start of Saint Seiya Next Dimension, the canonical continuation of Kurumada's original manga, a new Silver Saint was added to the universe, Crateris Suikyō, whose Cloth differs entirely from the one shown in the Saint Seiya Encyclopedia.

Voice actor: Yuriko Yamamoto, Fumiko Inoue, Christine Auten (English)
An enigmatic female Silver Saint of strong personality, she was assigned as mentor of the young Seiya when he arrived to Sanctuary, as both were of Japanese nationality. She instructed him in the ways of the Saints with a stern hand and strict discipline, enabling him to cultivate his enormous potential. Due to the code of the female Saints, Seiya never had the chance to know her mentor's facial features, as she always concealed her behind her mandatory mask. Although Seiya endured hardships during his training, he and Marin bonded strongly. Due to Marin's physical appearance, her pupil Seiya long wondered if she and her long-lost sister, Seika were one-and-the same, a question that would take time to be answered as Marin was aware of the machinations of the false Pope of Sanctuary and involved herself in the rebellion to overthrow him. Marin assists Seiya and the Bronze Saints in their battle against the Silver Saints, after which she disappears temporarily. During this absence, Marin made shocking discoveries when she entered, at the risk of her life, the forbidden place known as Star Hill, learning the truth about the false Pope and his rise to power. She reappears during the climax of the conflict of the twelve temples, saving Seiya's life and helping him to reach the Pope's chambers. During the resurrection of Poseidon, Marin once again parts on business of her own, reappearing until the climax of the war against Hades, when she reveals the reason of her long absence; She had been able to locate Seiya's sister, Seika, finally dissipating the enigma of her identity and ending a tortuous and (seemingly) futile search that had lasted years. Also, Marin reveals she had also been searching for her long lost brother, Tōma, who became an Angel, one of the servants of the goddess Artemis. During Seiya and the Bronze Saints' battle against Thanatos in the Elysion fields, Marin bravely opposes the deities' murderous attempts on Seika's life, finally achieving, after the defeat of Hades and his army, the rejoining of the siblings at long last. Recently, she battled the Angel Tōma, preventing him from taking Seiya's life. Although she felt Tōma as someone from her past, she remains ignorant of his true identity and relation to her.

Voice actor: Mami Koyama, Yuka Komatsu, Kira Vincent Davis (English)
A temperamental but courageous female Silver Saint, Athena's prohibition of women becoming Saints demanded of Shaina to abandon her femininity when starting her training as a Saint and forever hide her face from men. Shaina was mentor to Pegasus Seiya's rival Cassios, whose defeat seemingly caused Shaina to bear a grudge against Seiya. At first, Shaina served the false Pope of Sanctuary, as she was determined to take Seiya's life for the humiliation she caused her, but later, suspicion towards him grew in her, which led her to side with the Bronze Saints in their rebellion against Sanctuary. Shaina saved Seiya's life from Leo Aiolia, sent by the Pope to kill him; being gravely wounded herself, she revealed that her grudge derived not from the fact that Seiya defeated Cassios, but because Seiya was the first man to ever see Shaina's face, the worst offense against a female Saint. Rigid tradition forced female Saints to either of two choices: either kill the offender or fall in love with him, Shaina unwillingly choosing the latter. Convalescing during the conflict of the twelve temples, Shaina is shocked to learn about her pupil Cassios' death to save Seiya's life, to spare her from grieving. Shaina then saves Eagle Marin's life, who moments before had saved Seiya's in the funeral roses stairway. After the false Pope is defeated, Shaina pledges her loyalty to Athena. Despite her love towards Seiya being unrequited, during the battle against Poseidon, Shaina is instrumental in the victory of Athena's army, being sent by Libra Rōshi to bring the Bronze Saints the imprescindible Libra Gold Cloth and going as far as to challenge Poseidon herself, but suffering defeat. Mere weeks later, Shaina leads the Bronze Saints and the rankless soldiers of Sanctuary in the protection of the surroundings, after the invasion of Hades' army. In the climax of the battle against Underworld, Shaina valiantly risks her life to protect Seiya's sister Seika from the assault of the merciless Thanatos. After the death of Hades, Shaina reappears and joins Cygnus Hyōga and Eagle Marin in thwarting the attempt of Tōma, the Angel of the Heavenly Realm, on Seiya's life. Recently, Kurumada has revealed a connection between Shaina and the mysterious Ophiuchus Gold Saint, the cursed Saint and constellation of eras past.

Voice Actor: Yū Mizushima, Takayuki Sasada (OVA), Vic Mignogna (English)
Misty was a narcissist who considered himself inferior only to the goddess Athena herself. Misty made it clear when he was sent to Japan with his fellow Silver Saints to deal with the renegade Bronze Saints. When Phoenix Ikki came back to his senses with the help of his fellow Bronze Saints, the Lizard Saint created a landslide in the hopes of burying them, but he was unsuccessful. Aries Mu created illusions which made the four Black Saints look like the Bronze Saints and teleported them all eight from the landslide. The Silver Saints were deceived by the illusion and went after the Black Saints but Eagle Marin and Misty went after the real Pegasus. Marin, in hopes of saving Seiya, attacked her pupil with an illusion attack and buried him. Misty however didn't fall for it and took the Bronze Saint out of his grave and attacked him. The Silver Saint told Seiya that he had never been bruised in battle and that itself was true victory in Misty's view, never to be hurt by an opponent. During the fight some blood from Seiya fell on Misty, who was disgusted by it cleaned it off. Thus, he removed his Cloth and went into the nearby sea. Seiya deemed him crazy and as soon as Misty donned his Cloth again, the battle continued. After, a hard battle, Pegasus Seiya overcame Misty's attacks and defeated him.
In the adaptation to anime of the Hades arc from the manga, Misty was revived along with his fellow Silver Saints and was sent to fight the Bronze Saints. He was soon defeated by Cygnus Hyōga and proclaimed him a true Saint. In the same way as the revived Gold Saints, the Silver Saints had pledged loyalty to Hades while secretly remaining true Saints of Athena.

Voice Actor: Kōji Totani
Due to the Bronze Saints' crime against Sanctuary (participating in the Galaxian Wars), the Pope of Sanctuary issued the order to kill the young Saints. Mozes was one of the Silver Saints sent to deal with them, but due to Aries Mu's intervention, he killed the Black Dragon instead. Thinking they completed their mission, they retreated, but returned due to Misty and Babel's delay. Being accompanied by Hound Asterion, who could read minds, Mozes soon turned on Eagle Marin. After subduing her, they tied her upside down to a pole in the sea, to use her as bait for Pegasus Seiya. The plan failed, and Seiya engaged Mozes in combat. After a bloody battle, Seiya sprouted wings from his Cosmo, and Mozes was defeated.
In English publications of the manga it remains as "Whale" and in some versions as "Cetus". In addition, his name was rendered as "Moses" by Kurumada in his tomb in the graveyard of Sanctuary, in vol.14 of the manga.

Voice Actor: Yuji Mikimoto
Babel was the second Silver Saint to meet his defeat at the hands of the Bronze Saints. He was a master of pyrokinesis and was able to travel in the form of a will-o'-the-wisp. He was sent along with Misty, Asterion and Mozes to kill the Bronze Saints for their crimes against Sanctuary. However, due to Aries Mu's intervention, they went after the wrong Saints, ending up killing the Black Saints instead. Believing they had accomplished their mission, they retreated, though Misty stayed behind to confirm his suspicions. After some time, Babel grew worried and returned to find Misty dead on the beach. Cygnus Hyōga soon arrived and challenged the Silver Saint, who was confused because he thought he had already killed the Bronze Saint. Babel regained his composure and fought, confident he had the advantage with his flames, but was ultimately defeated by Hyōga's freezing Cosmo. Of all Silver Saints, Babel is the one who got the closest of defeating Athena's Bronze Saints, but his seemingly unavoidable victory was thwarted by the arrival of the three Steel Saints.
In the anime adaptation, Babel's constellation is spelled  rather than "Centaurus".

Voice Actor: Kazuo Hayashi
Due to the Bronze Saints' crime against Sanctuary (participating in the Galaxian Wars), the Pope issued the order that they had to be killed. Mozes was one of the Silver Saints sent to deal with them, but due to Aries Mu's intervention, Mozes killed Black Dragon instead. Thinking they had completed their mission, they retreated, but came back due to Misty and Babel's late return. As Asterion is one of the few people in the Sanctuary who can use telepathy, he soon discovered that Eagle Marin had betrayed them. After defeating her, he and Mozes used her as bait for Pegasus Seiya by tying her to a pole upside down in the sea. Pegasus Seiya came to them and narrowly managed to defeat Mozes, but was overwhelmed by Asterion's power. In the meantime, Eagle Marin was able to free herself and fought against Asterion. By closing her mind and thinking of nothing, she managed to defeat him, but let him live and return to Sanctuary with a warning to the Pope. It was later revealed in the Hades arc of the manga that Asterion had been killed after his return to Sanctuary, as a tombstone with his name engraved appears in the Sanctuary graveyard.

Voice Actor: Naoki Tatsuta
He was known in Sanctuary as the Saint who could control crows like his own limbs. Jamian was a rather goofy Saint with comically ugly facial features and stupid behaviour, but quite powerful and cunning as an enemy. He was part of the second team of Silver Saints that had the mission of kidnapping Saori Kido and destroying the Colosseum where the "Galaxian Wars" took place. He succeeded in kidnapping the young woman, but was followed by Pegasus Seiya. The Silver Saint overpowered the Bronze Saint, but Saori Kido retaliated with Athena's Cosmo, sending Jamian's crows to attack him instead. Confused and outraged, he called her a witch and charged, only to awkwardly fall from a cliff to his death after being defeated by Phoenix Ikki.

Voice Actor: Akira Kamiya(1987), Masaya Onosaka(2003)
Algol was a Silver Saint sent to destroy the Colosseum that the "Galaxian Wars" tournament took place in and kidnap Saori Kido. After Crow Jamian perished at the hands of Phoenix Ikki, Algol, Capella and Dante revealed themselves. The Phoenix Saint warned the other Bronze Saints that Algol was different from his friends, and Algol soon turned Andromeda Shun into stone with the Shield of Medusa, which could petrify opponents when it opened its eyes. Algol then battled with Dragon Shiryū, but was outsmarted when the Dragon Saint blinded his eyes with his own fingers so that he could not see the Medusa Shield, as last resort to stop Algol and save the other Bronze Saints' lives. After a lengthy battle, Algol charged for a final attack, but was in the end defeated by Shiryū, who heightened his Cosmo to "see" beyond his blindness.
Named after Algol, the proper name of beta star of constellation Perseus, which is comes from Arabic رأس الجاثيرأس الغول ra's al-ghūl, meaning head  of the ogre. Kurumada used the Arabic name (ra's al-ghūl) as the name of his technique Rhas Al-Ghûl Gorgoneion.

Voice Actor: Katsuji Mori
Capella was ordered along with Jamian, Algol and Dante to destroy the Graud Foundation Colosseum where the "Galaxian Wars" tournament had taken place, and to kidnap Saori Kido. After Jamian was defeated, Ikki mocked the Silver Saints by creating a line between himself and the Silver Saints that they should not step over. Capella took the dare and crossed the line, but was knocked unconscious by Ikki. Capella rose again and attacked the Bronze Saint with his flying discs, but was overwhelmed by the Phoenix Saint's illusionary skills and was killed by him - in a notable scene, Capella had both hands chopped off and chest gruesomely ripped open by his own disc, resulting in his death, although it is later revealed it was only an illusion, which utterly shattered his mind, ultimately killing him.

Named after Capella, the proper name of alpha star of constellation Auriga, which is derived from Latin, and is a diminutive of the Latin Capra, means female goat.

Voice Actor: Akira Murayama
Like Jamian, Shaina, Algol and Capella, he received the mission to destroy the Graud Foundation Colosseum were the "Galaxian Wars" tournament had taken place and kidnap Saori Kido. After Jamian was killed, Dante revealed himself with Algol and Capella to Phoenix Ikki, who had defeated Jamian. After Capella was knocked out by Ikki, Dante charged, only to have his chained steel balls destroyed by the Bronze Saint. The Phoenix Saint knocked Dante unconscious as well, to deal with Capella. Meanwhile, the other Bronze Saints arrived. Dante was furious due to his disgrace and went after Ikki, but was stopped by Andromeda Shun. During their fight, Shun said to Dante: "Your chains were merely designed to hold the hound of Hades," and added that they were like tinsel compared to his own Nebula Chains, which Shun used to defeat the Cerberus Saint.

Voice Actor: Daisuke Gouri (1987), Naoki Imamura(2003)
When Leo Aiolia went to Japan to deal with the rebelling Bronze Saints, he was sent under the watch of three Silver Saints. One of them was Algethi, who is physically the strongest Saint in the Sanctuary. When Aiolia decided to spare Pegasus Seiya's life for the moment, Algethi and the others jumped in and remarked that the Gold Saint was too soft, and decided to deal with Seiya themselves. After throwing Seiya around with their respective attacks, the young Bronze Saint received unexpected help from the Sagittarius Gold Cloth, enwrapping his body to protect him. The three Silver Saints did not heed Aiolia's warning to stay away and charged straight towards Seiya, only to be killed by the Sagittarius Gold Cloth in mere seconds.
Named after Algethi, the proper name of alpha star of constellation Hercules, which is comes from Arabic رأس الجاثي, ra's al-jaθiyy meaning Head of the Kneeler.
His technique Kornephoros named after the name of beta star of constellation Hercules, which derives from the Greek word "Korynephoros" meaning mace bearer.

Voice Actor: Ryouichi Tanaka
When Leo Aiolia went to Japan to deal with the rebelling Bronze Saints, he was sent under the watch of three Silver Saints. Dio was one of them, and spent most of the time sneering at the other Saints. When Aiolia decided to spare Pegasus Seiya's life for the moment, Dio and the others remarked that the Gold Saint was too soft, and decided to deal with Seiya themselves. After throwing Seiya around with their respective attacks, the young Bronze Saint received unexpected help from the Sagittarius Gold Cloth, enwrapping his body to protect him. The three Silver Saints did not heed Aiolia's warning to stay away, and charged straight towards Seiya, only to be killed by the Sagittarius Gold Cloth in mere seconds.

In the anime adaptation, his name is spelled .

Voice Actor: Ikuya Sawaki
When Leo Aiolia went to Japan to deal with the rebelling Bronze Saints, he was sent under the watch of three Silver Saints. Sirius led the group of Saints, and refused to ignore Aiolia's softness in handling the Bronze Saint. As Aiolia decided to spare Pegasus Seiya's life for the moment, Sirius and the others jumped in and remarked that the Gold Saint was too weak and decided to deal with Seiya themselves. After ganging up on Seiya, the young Bronze Saint was assisted by the Sagittarius Gold Cloth. The three Silver Saints did not heed Aiolia's warning to stay away, and were killed by the Gold Cloth.

Named after Sirius, the proper name of alpha star of constellation Canis Major, which is comes from the Ancient Greek: Σείριος Seirios, meaning glowing or scorcher.

Voice Actor: Yūichi Meguro
After the Bronze Saints pledged to help Saori Kido as Athena, they went to the Sanctuary in Greece. Ptolemy was sent to greet them there under orders of the Pope. After explaining how to reach the Pope through the twelve temples, he suddenly attacked the Saints with a shower of arrows. However, the shower of arrows was an illusion, only one was real; his target was Athena. The real arrow hit Athena in the chest, angering Seiya, who immediately retaliated. In his final moments, Ptolemy said that only the Pope could remove the arrow, and that it would take twelve hours for it to kill Athena.

Named after Ptolemy, the famed astrologer of Ancient Greece.

Voice Actor: Keiichi Noda
Mentor to Andromeda Shun and Chameleon June, having trained them on Andromeda Island. He was assassinated by Pisces Aphrodite when Daidalos sided with Shun in the belief that the Sanctuary was corrupted by evil. According to the official Saint Seiya Encyclopedia, he does not concentrate on one kind of attack method. He is skilled in nullifying attacks. He knows well how to manipulate weapons of other Cloths, that his own Cloth doesn't have. In the same way as Lyra Orphée, he was considered a Silver Saint with a level equal to that of a Gold Saint. His Silver Cloth represents the Cepheus constellation. In the anime, he was replaced by Cepheus , a character with a different appearance.

Voice Actor: Hiroshi Kamiya
A Silver Saint said to be as powerful as a Gold Saint, and also a musical virtuoso of the lyre. Just like the tragic Greek hero Orpheus, he had a lover called Eurydice whom died, and with determination he went to Hades and played his music to have Eurydice back. Having his wish fulfilled, he was told to not look back during the trek back to the world of the living, until he reached the surface, unfortunately, Sphinx Pharaoh faked a light from the sun and tricked Orphée into turning around. Eurydice turned halfway into stone and thus Orphée decided to stay with her forever in the underworld. When Athena's Saints invaded Hades' domains, he freed Pegasus Seiya and Andromeda Shun from the clutches of Pharaoh. This action eventually led to the revelation that Pharaoh had tricked Orphée and in a battle of music the Saint killed the Specter. Renewing his vows as a Saint, Orphée then made the choice to help his comrades and defeat Hades, and took them to the god's throne room. With sweet melody, he bespelled the 3 Judges and Pandora, but his trick did not work on Wyvern Rhadamanthys who eventually killed him. A predecessor from a past era, who bore his same constellation and the Lyra Cloth, called , was created by Masami Kurumada for the first Saint Seiya theatrical release.

A Silver Saint in the past Holy War between Hades and Athena set in 1747. He trained in the Sanctuary with Aries Shion and Libra Dohko and became a Silver Saint. He disappeared after being issued an order to investigate the countryside. He came to meet both Tenma and Alone one night during a snowstorm in Italy. From that day he came to be their teacher and taught Tenma the ways of the Saints without telling him their deeper meanings. Suikyō left them eventually and it wasn't until Alone had started turning into Hades that he showed himself again to Tenma, Shion and Dohko, this time, however, as the Heavenly Valiance Star, Garuda Suikyō. As a servant of Hades, he defeated the Saints but retreated when summoned by Pandora, who later sent him to infiltrate Sanctuary, with orders to kill the infant Athena. The Crateris Silver Cloth is endowed with the ability to heal wounds and to foresee the future, reflected in the water it contains.

Silver Saints of eras past
During the Hades arc, Kurumada showed the tombs of many deceased Silver Saints from past eras, in the graveyard of Sanctuary. Some of them were revived by Hades, as their tombs appeared opened. Even though they don't make a physical appearance, their names can be read in their tombs: Serge, Ludwig, Siroé, Gilles, Helga, Gavin, Tony, Kain, Algernon, Jose, Timothy, Gilles, Ivan, Nigel, Jun, Isac, Cima, Tess, and Edomon; and a few tombs with illegible names on them.

Gold Saints
The  are the most powerful Saints in Athena's Army and personal guard to her, invincible among them since the ages of myth. They wear the 12 Gold Cloths that correspond to the zodiac constellations, the most powerful among the 88 Cloths. The Gold Saints have mastered the seventh sense, the essence of Cosmo, which grants them miraculous abilities, among them, the capacity of attaining the speed of light. In Saint Seiya Next Dimension, it is revealed that there were originally 13 Gold Saints.

20th-century saints 

Voice actor: Kaneto Shiozawa (TV anime), Takumi Yamazaki (OVA), Paul Locklear (english)
The Aries Gold Saint in the 20th century, guardian of the Temple of the White Ram. Disciple and successor of Aries Shion, and mentor to Kiki. A calm young man whose serene exterior conceals prodigious strength, Mu is also a man of many talents, to the extent of being regarded as the most gifted Gold Saint in psychokinesis, as well as a master in the arts of Cloth restoration. Mu left the Sanctuary shortly after Shion's murder as he harbored suspicion about the legitimacy of the Pope, settling in the remote Jamir region. A valuable ally to the Bronze Saints, he first assists them in repairing their Cloths, a service he provides in more than one occasion. Mu saved the Bronze Saints' lives during the battles against the Black Saints and assisted Seiya in the duel against Lizard Misty. During the conflict of the twelve temples, he sides with Libra Dohko and the Bronze Saints, revealing to the latter the secret of the Seventh Sense and helping them in the insurrection against the false Pope, as he knew the truth behind his rise to power and the nature of the trial imposed by destiny on Athena. During the holy war against Poseidon, he keeps the eager Gold Saints from parting to the battle, as Hades' return to Earth was mere weeks away. During the war against Hades, Mu displays fearsome power and battle prowess by defeating powerful Specters, albeit falling before Wyvern Rhadamanthys, who then throws him into the Cocytos prison. Later on, he is revitalized by Athena's Cosmo and joins his Gold Saint comrades, in their final sacrifice to pierce the impervious Wailing Wall.

Voice actor: Tesshō Genda, Fumihiko Tachiki (Drama CD)
The Taurus Gold Saint in the 20th century, guardian of the Temple of the Golden Bull. A good natured giant who wielded wondrous physical strength and unmatched battle speed due to his technique similar to the iai combat principle, Aldebaran was a Gold Saint truly committed to the duty of protecting peace and justice on Earth. During the conflict of the twelve temples, he first opposed the Bronze Saints' rebellion against Sanctuary, as he was tricked by the Pope into deeming them traitors. Aldebaran was engaged in battle by Pegasus Seiya, whose determination in battle led his already increasing suspicions about the legitimacy of the Pope, to grow even further. Seiya swore to break off one of the horns of Aldebaran's helmet, to prove his cause was just. Aldebaran agreed, believing the young Saint wouldn't be capable of such a feat. To his astonishment, Seiya fulfills his promise, and Aldebaran allows him to pass through the Taurus Temple. Near the end of Seiya's battle against Gemini Saga, Aldebaran realizes his suspicions about the Pope were not far from the truth and swears allegiance to Athena once he meets her. In the Poseidon arc, Aldebaran protects the moribund Bronze Saints from Siren Sorrento's murder attempt, at the cost of deafening himself. During the war against Hades, Aldebaran is murdered by Deep Niobe, not without completely obliterating the Specter. He is later resurrected in the Underworld, and joins his Gold Saint comrades in the final sacrifice to pierce the impervious Wailing Wall, thus opening a gateway to Elysion.

Named after Aldebaran, the proper name of alpha star of constellation Taurus, which derives from the Arabic 'الدبران' al-dabarān and translates literally as "The follower"

Voice actor: Kazuyuki Sogabe (TV anime - bad side), Akio Nojima (TV anime - good side), Ryōtarō Okiayu (OVA) 
The main Gemini Gold Saint in the 20th century, first guardian of the Temple of the Twins and elder twin brother to Kanon. In the past the embodiment of the ideal Saint, Saga was a young man beloved by all, with a soul as pure as that of angel. A Saint whose heart was entirely devoted to Athena, Saga was afflicted by split personality, the seed of evil his brother Kanon manipulated to stray him from the path of virtue. Compelled by the evil side of his personality, Saga plotted to seize Sanctuary and murder the infant Athena to rule the world with an iron fist, putting his machinations at work once he usurped the aged Pope's throne by murdering him, although he failed to take Athena's life by Sagittarius Aiolos' intervention. Saga remained as the false Pope, cloaked in mystery for 13 years until his deception was uncovered by the rebellion of the Bronze Saints led by Athena, who managed to defeat him after a seemingly impossible battle. Freed from his evil side after his defeat, Saga takes his own life to atone for the atrocities he committed as the false Pope. Months later, Saga returns from beyond the grave, resurrected by Hades, having sworn fealty to the god while secretly remaining a true Saint of Athena.  Pretending to aim to take the goddess' life, Saga sought Athena to reveal the strategy for victory against Hades, ultimately watching in horror as the goddess took her own life in front of him and his comrades. Shortly after, Saga returns to the realm of the dead as the new life Hades bestowed on him was only temporary. Finally, in the climax of the war against the Underworld, Saga is brought back to life once again by Athena's divine Cosmo, and joins his Gold Saint comrades in the final sacrifice to pierce the impervious Wailing Wall.

Kurumada revealed he derived Saga's name from the kanji 性, which means gender, destiny or nature.

Voice actor: Kazuyuki Sogabe, Ryōtarō Okiayu
The secondary Gemini Saint in the 20th century, twin brother of Gemini Saga and second guardian of the Temple of the Twins. A man of many traits and consumed by evil since his youth, Kanon was truly a cardinal tool of destiny in the shaping of events in the present era, first, as instigator of Gemini Saga's rebellion, secondly as the moving force behind Poseidon's resurrection and lastly, as a formidable enemy of Hades' army. Shortly after Athena's advent in the 20th century, Kanon conspired to murder her and seize Sanctuary, trying to include his twin brother Saga in his machinations. Horrified by Kanon's intentions, Saga imprisoned him in Cape Sounion, sentencing him to death. While imprisoned, Kanon's life was sustained by a mysterious force, and he was able to find Poseidon's Submarine Temple. Removing Athena's seal from the Amphora that contained his soul, Poseidon was freed and Kanon fooled the deity into thinking he was one of his Mariner Generals, . As Poseidon revealed he would possess the young Julian Solo, Kanon plotted to manipulate Solo and harness Poseidon's power to fulfill his ambition of tyrannical reign. Years later, his plans soundly backfired, and Kanon regretted having freed Poseidon, at the cost of millions of human lives to the cataclysms brought upon Earth by the god of the seas. Later realizing it was Athena who mercifully saved his life while imprisoned, Kanon saves her life from Poseidon's attack and renounced his wicked ways after the deity's defeat. Days before the war against Hades, Kanon is cleansed of his evil by Athena who grants him her forgiveness for his numerous sins, and Kanon embraces his destiny as Gold Saint, not without being forced to tortuously prove the legitimacy of his conversion by Scorpio Milo. Choosing to bear the stigma of being responsible for the deaths of millions for the rest of his life, Kanon parts to the front and displays true courage and fearsome strength by wreaking havoc in Hades' ranks, defeating numerous powerful Specters, fueled by unfailing devotion and gratitude to Athena. Finally, at the climax of the war against Underworld, Kanon sends the Gemini Gold Cloth to his resurrected brother Saga to help in the piercing of the Wailing Wall, and having fulfilled his task, sacrifices his life removing Wyvern Rhadamanthys' terrible threat. Achieving redemption at last, Kanon dies happy of having finally been able to atone for his crimes in the past and use his power to help his fellow men.

Kurumada revealed he derived his name from Canon Island, in Ireland.

Voice actor: Ryōichi Tanaka, Kōichi Yamadera (Drama CD), Rob Mungle (English)
The Cancer Gold Saint in the 20th century, guardian of the Temple of the Giant Crab. Endowed with the ability to freely traverse the threshold to the realm of the dead. Cunning and merciless, Deathmask strayed from the ideals of the Saints, and made no distinction between enemy and innocent, and kept the souls of his victims as trophies in his temple, tormenting them by depriving of their eternal rest. With a nihilism perception of the justice, Deathmask swore allegiance to the false Pope as he considered his evil deeds might be deemed justice by the public in the future. He was sent by the Pope to murder Libra Dohko in Lushan, but desisted due to the intervention of Aries Mu and Dragon Shiryū. During the conflict of the twelve temples, Deathmask faced Shiryū in a duel to the death, in the Hill to the Land of Spirits. After a lengthy battle, Deathmask was abandoned by the Cancer Gold Cloth, which deemed him unworthy of donning it and of the title of Gold Saint. Shiryū narrowly defeated Deathmask, sending him to his death in the entrance to the Underworld. It was revealed in the Poseidon arc, that Deathmask found his forgotten duty to Athena after death. Deathmask is later resurrected by Hades, to whom he swore loyalty while secretly remaining a true Saint of Athena. He is sent to the Underworld once again by Wyvern Rhadamanthys. Finally, he is resurrected once again, and demonstrates his redemption by joining his Gold Saint comrades in their final sacrifice to pierce the impervious Wailing Wall, to open a gateway to Elysion.

Named after the ancient practice of funerary deathmasks.

Voice actor: Hideyuki Tanaka, Toshiyuki Morikawa (Drama CD)
The Leo Gold Saint in the 20th century, guardian of the Temple of the Lion, and younger brother of Sagittarius Aiolos. A powerful and virtuous young man of exceptional human quality, passionate for his duty of protecting peace and justice and with a heart burning with loyalty towards Athena, Aiolia was regarded, along Scorpio Milo, as the pride of Sanctuary. Despite having grown up under the undeserved stigma of betrayal of his brother, Aiolos' memory shone brightly in Aiolia's life. He was loyal to the false Pope as he was deceived by him into deeming the Bronze Saints traitors and Saori Kido an usurper of Athena's name. Aiolia is sent by the Pope to kill the Bronze Saints, under the watch of three Silver Saints. He engages Pegasus Seiya in battle as he refuses to reveal the location of his comrades. Aiolia is astonished to witness the Sagittarius Gold Cloth protect Seiya and kill the Silver Saints, helping then Seiya in his battle. Afterward, a vision of his deceased brother confirms the teenager to be a genuine Saint, and Kido to be the true Athena. Having discovered the truth, Aiolia pledges loyalty to Athena and returns to Sanctuary, facing the Pope and revealing he knew about his scheme. In a brief battle, the Pope succeeds in crushing Aiolia's rebellion and subjects him under his control with his Demon Emperor's Dellusional Fist, the effects of which wouldn't cease until Aiolia took a life. During the conflict of the twelve temples, Aiolia opposses the Bronze Saints insurrection due to the Pope's control and is stopped from killing Seiya by Cassios, who sacrifices his life to save Seiya's. Regaining his senses, Aiolia joins the Bronze Saints' rebellion and pledges again loyalty to Athena after the defeat of Saga. During the war against Poseidon, Aiolia is eager to join the battle against the deity, being restrained of doing so by Aries Mu, as the war against Hades was mere weeks away and Aiolia's strength would be indispensable. In the war against Underworld, Aiolia lives up to his reputation by defeating many powerful Specters, albeit suffering defeat at the hands of Wyvern Rhadamanthys, who throws him into the Cocytos prison. Later on, Aiolia is revitalized by Athena's Cosmo and in the climax of the battle, he reencounters his brother Aiolos and joins him and his Gold Saint comrades in the final sacrifice to pierce the impervious Wailing Wall.

Named after the mythological floating island of Aiolia, home of Aiolos, the god of winds.

Voice actor: Yūji Mitsuya, Akemi Sato (kid - OVA), Nobuyuki Hiyama (Drama CD)
 The Virgo Gold Saint in the 20th century, guardian of the Temple of the Maiden. An enlightened being who despite his youth conversed with the gods and deemed spiritual realms irrelevant to him, Shaka's mastery of the mysteries of Cosmo in all its aspects granted him incredible might, thus being regarded in Sanctuary as "the man who is almost a god". Shaka deprived himself of the sense of sight in order to accumulate Cosmo, thus it was said no one survived once he opened his eyes. Despite Shaka was a Buddhist by conviction and a true Gold Saint who fought for justice, he was loyal to the false Pope of Sanctuary, as his ability to discern a being's true nature revealed to him that the Pope's was a benevolent one. During the conflict of the twelve temples, Shaka fought the Bronze Saints' rebellion, as he was tricked into deeming them traitors. Phoenix Ikki faced Shaka in a duel to the death. Against all odds, Ikki became triumphant, and both combatants were hurled to an alternate plane of existence in the aftermath. Both Saints return to the physical plane with Aries Mu's help and Shaka sided with the Bronze Saints once he learned the truth about the Pope and pledged loyalty to Athena. During the holy war against Poseidon, Shaka remained in Sanctuary as his strength would be indispensable in the upcoming war against Hades, during which, Shaka wreaked havoc in the ranks of Hades' army. Shaka reveals the secret of the Eighth Sense to the Bronze Saints and to Athena, a crucial gambit to achieve victory against Hades. Acquires Eighth Sense is he goes in the world of the dead. Finally, in the climax of the battle against Underworld, Shaka joins his Gold Saint comrades in their final sacrifice to pierce the impervious Wailing Wall, to open a gateway to Elysion. He reappears in Next Dimension as his soul manifests from Nirvana in the past, coming to the assistance of Shun and Tenma to prove their status as true Saints of Athena, to Virgo Shijima.

Shaka's name is an alternate Japanese form referring to Shakya or Shakyamuni (Gautama Buddha), also known in Japanese as Shaka Nyorai, the historical Buddha.

Voice actor: Kōji Yada (old), Michitaka Kobayashi (young - TV anime), Kenyu Horiuchi (young - OVA), Kōichi Yamadera (Drama CD), Kenyū Horiuchi (Drama CD)
A former Bronze Saint who was promoted to Gold Saint, Dohko is, along with his close friend Aries Shion, the only other survivor of the war against Hades in the 18th century, during which he was guardian of the Temple of the Balance. Regarded as a man who boasted the greatest raw strength and power among the Gold Saints, and revered as the wise father figure known as Rōshi, the Old Master, Dohko exerted the task of judging good and evil among the Saints, and his guidance was a key element in the triumphs of the Bronze Saints in the 20th century. After Hades' defeat in the past, Dohko was granted by Athena the divine gift of the Misopethamenos, a miraculous ability that turned his body virtually impervious to aging, as he was entrusted by her to guard the tower that contained the sealed souls of Hades' Specters, in the centuries to come, as their resurrection would be the harbinger of the advent of the new holy war. Dohko returned to his home in Lushan and spent the next almost three centuries waiting for Hades' return, becoming a diminutive, wrinkled man. During this time, he refused to attend the summons from the false Pope of Sanctuary, and he adopted the orphaned Shunrei and mentored Dragon Shiryū, instilling in him the ideals of the Saints and those of men of peace. During the conflict of the twelve temples, Dohko sided with the Bronze Saints and lent them the use of the Libra Gold Cloth, to release Cygnus Hyōga from Aquarius Camus' imprisonment. After the defeat of the false Pope, Dohko joins Aries Mu in the revelation of the truth behind Saga's rise to power, and became the highest authority among the Saints. During the war against Poseidon, Dohko exerts his authority forbidding the Gold Saints from taking part in the battle, as their strength would be indispensable in the upcoming war against Hades and sent the Libra Gold Cloth to the Bronze Saints, as it was indispensable for destroying Poseidon's Mammoth Pillars. Mere weeks later, Dohko realizes the moment he waited for almost three centuries finally came, and parts to the front to battle against Hades a second time, regaining his youth and the formidable battle prowess he displayed in the 18th century. Dohko's experience from the past proves a crucial element in the Saints' victory, as he revealed the secret of the Eighth Sense, he devised a strategy to pierce the Wailing Wall and revealed the location of Hades' true body in Elysion. Finally, in the climax of the battle, Dohko joins his Gold Saint comrades and sacrifices his life to open the gateway to Elysion, stoically ending a long, admirable and heroic life in the service of Athena.

His name is occasionally rendered in translations as Tóng-Hǔ, the chinese reading of the kanji of his name, meaning "young tiger", in both Japanese and Chinese.

Voice actor: Shūichi Ikeda (TV anime), Toshihiko Seki (OVA)
The Scorpio Gold Saint in the 20th century, guardian of the Temple of the Heavenly Scorpion. A man of honor, of immaculate conduct and with immense fervor for Athena, Milo was regarded along with Leo Aiolia, as the pride of Sanctuary. As a Gold Saint, he was loyal to Athena, and thus he was obedient to the false Pope of Sanctuary, not without harboring suspicion about his legitimacy. During the conflict of the twelve temples, Milo first opposed the Bronze Saints' insurrection, as the Pope Saga tricked him into deeming them traitors and regarding Saori Kido a usurper of Athena's name. He is engaged in a fierce duel by Cygnus Hyōga, the battle becoming so intense, Milo is forced to use his killing strike Antares, for the very first time, on Hyōga. Moribund, Hyōga crawls desperately to try to save the wounded Saori's life. Milo is shocked by Hyōga's determination and loyalty, and realizes that they can come only from devotion to the true Athena, and neutralizes Antares' effects to save Hyōga's life, and confirms his suspicions. After the defeat of Saga, Milo pledges loyalty to Saori Kido as he recognized her as the true Athena. During the holy war against Poseidon, Milo was eager to invade the Submarine Temple to join the battle against the god's Mariner Generals and save the Bronze Saints' lives, being restrained from doing so by Aries Mu, since the Gold Saints were to be a crucial asset in the upcoming war against Hades, which broke out within mere weeks. In the war against Hades, Milo protects Athena and subjects Gemini Kanon to a tortuous trial to prove his devotion to the goddess, and recognizes him as a true Gold Saint. Later on, Milo is defeated by Wyvern Rhadamanthys and thrown into the Cocytos prison. In the climax of the battle, Milo is revitalized by Athena's Cosmo, and offers his life along his Gold Saint comrades in the final sacrifice to pierce the impervious Wailing Wall.

Voice actor: Yūsaku Yara, Isshin Chiba (Drama CD)
The Sagittarius Gold Saint in the 20th century, guardian of the Temple of the Centaur. The embodiment of virtuousness and moral excellence, and a role model for the Saints of the Sanctuary. He was Leo Aioria's older brother and subject of his profound admiration. His qualities and deep devotion to Athena, made the aged Pope choose him as his successor, the event sparking Saga's rebellion. Aiolos foiled Saga's assassination attempt on the infant Athena, and was mortally wounded by Capricorn Shura who was deceived by Saga to deem him a traitor. Protecting Athena to the very end at the cost of his life, Aiolos died under the stigma of betrayal. His name was cleared years later by Athena when she cleansed the Sanctuary of Saga's evil. Even in death, he continues to protect Athena by lending Seiya his strength and granting him the donning of the Sagittarius Gold Cloth in dire situations, such as his battle against three Silver Saints and the final battle against the gods Poseidon and Thanatos. Finally, he resurrects in the Underworld and sacrifices his life along the rest of the Gold Saints to pierce the impervious Wailing Wall.

Kurumada named him after Aiolos, the ruler or god of the Winds in Greek mythology.

Voice actor: Kōji Totani (TV anime), Takeshi Kusao (OVA)
 The Capricorn Gold Saint in the 20th century, guardian of the Temple of the Mountain Goat. Extremely strong, he wielded the power of Excalibur, which made his limbs sharp as a razor blade. A serene warrior, Shura possessed many qualities of a true Saint, but he was loyal to the false Pope as he believed that those with power were automatically righteous, and even though the Pope was evil, he could still change the evaluation standard of people exerting his power. Deceived by the Pope, Shura mortally wounded Sagittarius Aiolos as he tried to protect the infant Athena. During the conflict of the Twelve Temples, Shura is engaged in battle by Dragon Shiryū. After a bloody battle, witnessing Shiryū's willingness to sacrifice his life to protect Athena and justice, Shura was flooded by his seemingly forgotten loyalty to the goddess. Shiryū's final attack would kill his opponent at the cost of his life, moved by the young Saint's quality, Shura passes on to him the power of Excalibur and commands the Capricorn Gold Cloth to protect Shiryū to save his life, dying in his stead. After death, Shura returns to being a truly noble and selfless Saint, abiding by their ideals, and saves Shiryū's life once again with his guidance to defeat Poseidon's Mariner Chrysaor Krishna. Shura proves once more his commitment to protect peace and justice, when he pledges loyalty to Hades while secretly remaining a true Saint. As he dies once again in the events of the Hades arc, he resurrects again in the Underworld, and finally sacrifices his life along his Gold Saint comrades to pierce the impervious Wailing Wall.

Kurumada named him after the Shura, an alternate Japanese term referring to the Ashura, the fierce battling demigods of Buddhist doctrine.

Voice actor: Rokurō Naya (TV anime), Nobutoshi Canna (OVA)
The Aquarius Gold Saint in the 20th century, guardian of the Temple of the Precious Vessel. A righteous Saint who led an exemplary life, Camus mentored Cygnus Hyōga and Poseidon's Mariner Kraken Isaac. He taught them the ways of the Saints, emphasizing stoicism and impassiveness in battle, to be able to protect peace on Earth. Although he was suspicious of the Pope, Camus stood against the Bronze Saints rebellion as he was tricked into deeming them traitors. During the conflict of the twelve temples, Camus battled his disciple Hyōga in a duel to the death. Witnessing his pupil's determination, Camus realized his suspicions were correct, and decided to teach him the ultimate secret of the absolute zero, to guarantee Hyōga's victory against the Pope. Thus Camus perished but his memory and teachings continue to burn brightly in Hyōga's life. Even beyond the grave, Camus continues to protect Athena and Hyōga as he encouraged him to victory in dire situations. Camus is later resurrected by Hades, to whom he swore fealty while secretly remaining a true Saint of Athena. Although he dies again during the events of the war against Hades, he is brought back to life in the Underworld, and joins his Gold Saint comrades in their final sacrifice to pierce the impervious Wailing Wall.

Voice actor:Keiichi Nanba, Yasunori Matsumoto (Drama CD)
The Pisces Gold Saint in the 20th century, guardian of the Temple of the Twin Fish. With might as immense as his beauty, atrocity tainted his heart, and swearing allegiance to the false Pope of Sanctuary despite knowing of his murder of the old Pope, justifying this with his belief that the force itself is justice therefore justice is wielded by the strongest. Aphrodite murdered Cepheus Daidalos, mentor to Andromeda Shun and Chameleon June, to punish his rebellion against the Pope. During the conflict of the Twelve Temples, Aphrodite was killed by Shun after a lengthy battle, in revenge for his master's murder. It was revealed in the Poseidon arc, that Aphrodite found his forgotten loyalty to Athena after death. In the Hades arc, Aphrodite is resurrected along the other deceased Gold Saints, swearing allegiance to Hades, while secretly remaining a true Saint of Athena. He is sent to the Underworld by Wyvern Rhadamanthys and later joins his Gold Saint comrades, sacrificing his life along with theirs, to pierce the impervious Wailing Wall.

Named after Aphrodite, the Greek goddess of beauty and love"

18th-century saints 

Voice actor: Nobuo Tobita, Shinichiro Miki (Lost Canvas, Drama CD)
A former Bronze Saint who was promoted to Gold Saint, Shion is, along with Libra Dohko, a survivor of the war against Hades in the 18th century, during which he was guardian of the Temple of the White Ram. After Hades' defeat, he was chosen as the Pope of Sanctuary by Athena, his reign lasting until the late 20th century, when he was murdered by Gemini Saga, who usurped his position. He was mentor to Aries Mu, instructing him in the ways of the Saints and the arts of Cloth restoration. Shion was resurrected 13 years after his death by Hades, and offered eternal life in exchange of his loyalty and Athena's life. Incorruptibly loyal to the goddess even in the cold embrace of death, Shion accepted the offer, while secretly remaining a true Saint of Athena, his strategy was emulated by the rest of revived Saints. Shion's true purpose was to reach Athena to deliver her Cloth, later becoming unable to do so due to the goddess' unforeseen (and early) suicide. Instead, Shion instructs the Bronze Saints about the secret of Athena's Cloth and reveals the mystery of the ultimate state of the Cloths bathed in divine blood. Instrumental in the downfall of Hades in the 20th century, Shion issues his last order as Pope to the Bronze Saints, to invade the Underworld and kill Hades, before exhaling his final breath.

The Taurus Gold Saint in the 18th century, Ox is a giant who also wields the power of the Golden Bull. He first appears while punishing Shion and Dohko for trying to kill Alone, something he considers reckless and adventurous, as both Shion and Dohko have recently been promoted to Gold Saints and have yet to master their seventh sense. In the same way, he tries to stop Tenma, as he is only a novice Bronze Saint. He later joins Capricorn Izō in the shocking realization that their goddess might come from the future. Virgo Shijima confirms their suspicions and after a short while the goddess descends to the base of Athena's statue at the top of the Sanctuary. Ox and the others hurry up where they find an infant Athena, though are ordered to return to their temples by the pope's orders. Later on, Ox effortlessly kills the cadre of Specters accompanying Garuda Suikyō, and then engages the latter in battle, displaying enormous strength, but he is outsmarted by the Specter and killed.

Named after ox, in reference to his constellation and his massive frame.

The younger Gemini Gold Saint in the 18th century and guardian of the Temple of the Twins in that era, who decided to raise his hand against Athena. He forces Andromeda Shun and Pegasus Tenma to wander the labyrinth of his Temple. He engages both Bronze Saints in battle, to be later interrupted by the arrival of Garuda Suikyō, who questions him about his motives for his betrayal of Athena, a question Abel then reciprocates as they engage in a duel. Where Abel, hits Suikyo with legendary technique that controls the mind the "GenroMao-ken". It is later revealed that Abel is said to be his brother Cain's shadow, a manifestation of Cain's evil side, a phenomenon the latter has experienced since childhood. According to Phoenix Ikki, it is neither a case of split personality or of twins, and it is revealed by Cain that they were born by a divine gimmick.

Named after the biblical Abel, son of Adam and Eve.

The Gemini Saint in the 18th century, also guardian of the Temple of the Twins in that era. Older brother of Gemini Abel. He arrives to the Temple during the battle between his brother and Garuda Suikyō. Regarded as a Gold Saint truly committed to Athena and justice. Cain, duels against Phoenix Ikki engaging in a fierce battle, eventually allowing him to go beyond the third temple of Sanctuary.

Named after the biblical Cain, son of Adam and Eve.

The Cancer Gold Saint in the 18th century and guardian of the Temple of the Giant Crab, who, as an undertaker of sorts, endlessly opens the Praesepe gateway to the underworld to restless souls who are still attached to the physical plane. Also known to Sanctuary as Deathtoll the coffin maker, and as a Gold Saint whose speech reveals a flamboyant androgynous personality, he seems to be committed to both his tasks, as guardian and coffin maker, also serving his interests first then pledging his loyalty to any deity he can profit from. He tries to prevent Andromeda Shun and Pegasus Tenma from trespassing the Temple he guards, entrapping them in hayaoke caskets to send them to the Hill to the Land of Spirits. As Shun manages to return from the Praesepe abyss, and Tenma barely escaped due to a faulty casket, Deathtoll is forced to employ the mysterious Omertà casket, the coffin of silence passed down from the ages of myth, to ensure they can never return, as it absorbs those who rebel against Athena, trapping them for eternity. After Garuda Suikyō arrives to Deathtoll's temple, he tries to trick him into killing the young Bronze Saints, only to become the Specter's target. Forced to fight seriously, Deathtoll takes on all three opponents, easily overpowering them. Determined to kill his opponents by throwing them into the abyss of the underworld, Deathtoll picks Suikyō as his first victim, thus Pegasus Tenma devises a desperate strategy to distract the Gold Saint by toying with his psyche, and take advantage of his distraction to use the Omertà casket , which absorbs Deathtoll, thus saving their lives. Defeated, Deathtoll is last seen crying for help from within the Omertà casket, trapped for eternity. Later on, Deathtoll returns from the Hill to the Land of Spirits with the assistance of several Specters who freed him, who spared him in exchange of him becoming their guide through Sanctuary. Deathtoll takes the Specters to the Temple of the Lion, who are then slaughtered by Goldie and Leo Kaiser. Deathtoll then reveals to Kaiser that his allegiance is to Athena, and also asks him to grant Suikyō the compassion of a fellow warrior, as the three are comrades in arms. Later on, upon Phoenix Ikki's arrival to the past, both he and Deathtoll travel to the Praesepe deathly gateway, and defeat dozens of Specters, led by Griffon Vermeer, who mocking Suikyō's death, enrages Deathtoll, who proceeds to take Vermeer on single-handedly, to protect Ikki. Vermeer subjects Deathtoll to excruciating torture, but is unable to break the Gold Saint's iron will. Ikki arrives shortly after and helps defeat the Magnate of the Underworld, and Deathtoll deals a humiliating final blow, hoping to pay his debt to Suikyō. Afterward, Deathtoll joins Ikki in his traversing through the Twelve Temples, and becomes witness of his battle against Leo Kaiser.

The Leo Gold Saint in the 18th century and guardian of the Temple of the Lion in that era, known in Sanctuary as the Savage Lion. He fiercely protects his Temple assisted by his pet , a gigantic armor-clad lion. A true, righteous and noble Saint of legendary might, Kaiser is fiercely loyal to Athena, and thus he subjects Andromeda Shun and Pegasus Tenma to a tortuous trial, later discovering the loyalty of the young Bronze Saints with the help of Goldie. Later, Kaiser defeats the Worm Specter effortlessly, and is warned by Cancer Deathtoll, who reveals his true allegiance, that they're under the scrutiny of the fairies of the Underworld. It is also revealed that Goldie has a twin sister, the lioness , and both were taken care of by Kaiser since their birth. After letting the young Saints go through his temple, Kaiser is later challenged by Phoenix Ikki, whom he also battles to discover his true allegiance. Recognizing him as a true Saint and as a likely successor in the future after a fierce battle, Kaiser allows Ikki to go through his temple and again stands guard, awaiting for any new threat that may come and staying alert during the current crisis.

Named after Kaiser, the German word for "emperor", in reference to the animal represented by his constellation.

The Virgo Gold Saint in the 18th century. Called "the silent man" and also, like his successor in the 20th century, known as "the man who is almost a god", Shijima is regarded as the most righteous man among Athena's Saints. As his name reveals, Shijima remains mostly silent, in order to gather his Cosmo by depriving himself of speaking, and projects his thoughts to communicate with others. He first appeared in Chapter 14 of Next Dimension. He mentions to Taurus Ox and Capricorn Izō that he has felt Athena's Cosmo from the future, coming near to the time dimension they live in. Soon enough Athena descends to the sanctuary in a crash, the Saints hurry up to Athena's statue at the top of Sanctuary where the Goddess Cosmo impacted. There they find an infant Athena sleeping in a small crater. Shijima goes forward and is about to pick up the goddess when the Holy Pope appears telling them to step back. As the pope picks the baby up in his arms he orders the Gold Saints to return to their temples. On the way down, Shijima senses something bad and heads back to Athena's statue, where the Pope is about to stab the baby Athena with a dagger. Shijima pulls the baby away and at the same time Pisces Cardinale appears. The Pisces Saint first questions the Pope's wrongdoings but attacks Shijima with a deadly Bloody Rose, making Shijima fall to the ground, who later recovers and flees to protect Athena. Later on, Shijima manages to escape the Labyrinth of the Gods illusion in the Pope's chamber with the help of Ariadne's thread and risks his life carrying Athena through the funeral roses stairway, where he is attacked by Ophiuchus Odysseus venomous snakes, who are able to bite Athena. Against all odds, Shijima receives the help of a converted Cardinale, and even though gravely wounded, reaches the next Temple and entrusts the moribund Athena to Aquarius Mystria, and then succumbs to his wounds.

Named after the Shijima, the Buddhist philosophy of stillness, silence and oneness.

Voice actor: Kōji Yada (as Rōshi), Michitaka Kobayashi, Kenyū Horiuchi (Drama CD)
See above.

The Scorpio Gold Saint in the 18th century, and guardian of the Temple of the Heavenly Scorpion. A mysterious Saint with a seemingly incorporeal form, he appears before Dragon Shiryū to prevent him from trespassing his temple. Écarlate then reveals he is endowed with the ability of invisibility, which he can trigger at will, as a result of a strange blood disease that was caused by the bite of a scorpion as a child, and then being saved from certain death by a blood transfusion from Ophiuchus Odysseus himself. Écarlate, though at heart a righteous Saint, deems Athena as unnecessary due to the impending resurrection of Odysseus; thus engages the Dragon Saint in a fierce duel for the right of trespassing his temple, almost taking Shiryū's life after subjecting him to the excruciating torture of his Scarlet Needle, until the secret within Libra Dohko's staff prevents him from doing so. The staff reveals a pearl-shaped jewel inside, which embeds itself in Shiryū's body, the claw of the dragon mark in his back grasping it, as a signal of Shiryū being the chosen one of the Dragon god. Acknowledging Shiryū as a man who walks the path of virtue and therefore a true Saint, Écarlate proceeds to honor him dealing his final blow as mercy, while Shiryū fights back. Exchanging blows, Shiryū misses as Écarlate's attack is successful. Moved by the young Saint's quality, Écarlate acknowledges defeat and spares him and stops the bleeding, allowing him to trespass his Temple. In the aftermath, Écarlate ponders about Athena and the purpose of Odysseus' return.

 Kurumada named him after the french word for "scarlet"

The Sagittarius Gold Saint in the 18th century and guardian of the Temple of the Centaur. Seemingly a living centaur, like those in Greek myth and represented by his constellation, Gestalt suffered a physical transformation by the intervention of Ophiuchus Odysseus, whose untimely death was also mourned by him, years ago. Crushed by the death of his beloved steed Tanya as a child, the young Gestalt begged Odysseus to bring it back to life, a wish he granted by merging Gestalt's body with that of Tanya, becoming a centaur, an action Gestalt deemed a miracle worked by Odysseus. Years later, encountering Cygnus Hyōga, Gestalt prevents him from trespassing his Temple, gravely wounding the Bronze Saint and proceeding to execute him and the infant Athena, whom he doesn't recognize as his goddess, the time-space distortion through Sanctuary allows Gestalt witness the appearance of Sagittarius Aiolos' testament in the 20th century. Still unconvinced of Athena's true divine nature, Gestalt decides to test her, by challenging her to stop the powerful Arrow of the Goddess, the heirloom of the Sagittarius Gold Saints since the ages of myth. Athena fulfills Gestalt's challenge and tells him the truth about his condition, his body is not that of a centaur, but a human's, a mere illusion employed by Ophiuchus Odysseus to prevent his fragile psyche as a child to succumb to the pain of his loss. Moved by Athena's gesture of mercy towards him despite being near death, Gestalt acknowledges her as his goddess, and lets them to go forward as Sanctuary trembles due to the return of the Ophiuchus Saint; later on, Gestalt ponders about the consequences of Odysseus inexorable resurrection. A formidable warrior, Capricorn Izō acknowledges him as the fiercest Gold Saint that has ever lived.

Kurumada named him after the Gestalt principle of perception, in relation to his ambiguous appearance.

The Capricorn Gold Saint in the 18th century. Wielder of the power of Excalibur, he is also known as "Izō, killer of demons". His Excalibur manifests in the image of a nihontō, instead of a European sword. A calm and collected Gold Saint, he punishes Tenma, Shion and Dohko for committing an irresponsible act, due to their inexperience, although he does so with indulgence. He later joins Taurus Ox in the shocking realization that their goddess might come from the future. Their suspicions are confirmed by Virgo Shijima, and shortly after the goddess Athena descends with a crash. The Saints head to the site of her descent, where they find an infant Athena, but are told by the Pope to head back to their temples. Izō is then seen standing guard in his temple, astonished by the shockwaves of the clash between Aquarius Mystria and Cygnus Hyōga and killing the invading snake swarm. Izō then awaits for any threat that may appear until the arrival of Hyōga, whom he subjects to a deadly trial of will. Hyōga's determination convinces Izō of his commitment to Athena, and wisely lets him trespass his Temple, aware of the little one's critical condition; not without warning the Cygnus Saint about the fearsome might of Sagittarius Gestalt, who lies ahead.

Kurumada named him after the historical figure Izō Okada, the famous samurai from the Bakumatsu period.

The Aquarius Gold Saint in the 18th century, and guardian of the Temple of the Precious Vessel, regarded as the purest and noblest man in Sanctuary. He engages Cygnus Hyōga in battle and disables him quickly by freezing him, as he doesn't believe he is a Saint from the future. Mystria comes to the assistance of the moribund Virgo Shijima, encountering the infant goddess for the first time. As Hyōga frees himself of Mystria's restraint, both combatants engage each other in a duel, as Mystria doesn't recognize Athena as his goddess nor Hyōga as a comrade. Having been entrusted Athena's life by Shijima, Mystria promises to deliver her to Hyōga if he proves he is a true Saint, which he accomplishes by having Mystria witness his true mastery of the martial philosophy of the Saints of ice, stopping the Gold Saint's ultimate technique, the Aurora Execution, with his own, which he reveals to be the precious legacy of his mentor to him. Astonished by Hyōga's might, which came close to claiming his life, and his commitment as a Saint, Mystria then revitalizes the exhausted Bronze Saint and entrusts the little one to him, sending him forth to his encounter with Capricorn Izō.

The Pisces Gold Saint in the 18th century, regarded as the personification of beauty. Cardinale is first introduced during the Pope's assassination attempt on the infant Athena, which is foiled by Virgo Shijima. Witnessing Shijima's efforts to protect the goddess, Cardinale deems the Pope a traitor and prepared to impart retribution on him, however, Shijima becomes the target of his deadly attack. Pisces has stated his loyalty to Hades, although his motives and true allegiance remain shrouded in mystery. He chases after Shijima with the intent to kill him and Athena by orders from the Pope, and fails to do so due to the intervention of Athena. After witnessing the power of the goddess, Cardinale is moved and converts, recognizing the infant Athena as her true incarnation, and renews his vows of loyalty to her. Coming to the assistance of the gravely wounded Athena and Virgo Shijima who are suddenly attacked by Ophiuchus Odysseus' servants, Cardinale seemingly perishes while protecting them both from certain death.

 The Ophiuchus Silver Saint in the 18th century. Once well respected and highly loved by Sanctuary and the people of Greece, Odysseus had the gratitude and admiration of the rest of the Gold Saints of the 18th century, whom felt a debt of life towards him, with the exception of Capricorn Izō. Ironically, having saved countless lives through his knowledge of the healing arts and his own blood, endowed with miraculous properties; Odysseus succumbed to the toll on his body, his passing being considered the worst of tragedies to befall upon Sanctuary.  Resurrecting years later for unknown reason and by the workings of an unknown force, Odysseus returns as the Ophiuchus Gold Saint of legend, determined to take Athena's life, traversing the twelve temples testing the loyalties of the Gold Saints, to determine it being either to their goddess or to himself, the savior of their childhood years. The background and motivations of the Ophiuchus Odysseus are now being explored in detail by Kurumada, in the ongoing installments of Next Dimension.

The legendary thirteenth Gold Saint, regarded as a cursed fellow and constellation, who fell into oblivion in the Sanctuary grounds eons ago. Suikyō refers to him in his message to Athena, and his sole mention causes Virgo Shijima to tremble in fear. Sealed in the past, the imminent resurrection of the Ophiuchus Gold Saint seems to spell doom for all those who dwell in Sanctuary, even going as far to somehow affect Ophiuchus Shaina, who bears the same constellation, in the 20th century. According to legend, in the ages of myth,  Asclepios was regarded as the most powerful among them and among the 88 Saints. Seemingly, despite his initially selfless and loving nature, Asclepios' ambition was to become a god, thus he was punished and sealed. The background and motivations of Ophiuchus Asclepios are now being explored in detail by Kurumada, in the ongoing installments of Next Dimension.

See also

List of Saint Seiya characters

References

s
Fictional paramilitary organizations